The Boulder station is a retired train depot in Boulder, Colorado. It was originally built in 1890 in downtown Boulder to serve as a depot for the Union Pacific railroad. The depot was built in a modified Richardson Romanesque style from native Boulder County stone. The depot operated as a train station at its original location until 1957, when a new depot opened and replaced it.

The depot was purchased by a bus company and it functioned as a bus transit terminal until 1973, when the Boulder Jaycees' purchase saved it from demolition; it was moved it to a location near the original Boulder County, Colorado Fairgrounds. The efforts of the Boulder Jaycees and Historic Boulder, Inc. were instrumental in preserving the structure.

In October 2008, the City of Boulder and the Colorado Regional Transportation District moved the depot again, this time to the site of a new, transit-oriented development on the east side of 30th Street.

In December 2015, the depot reopened as a restaurant and bar named Roadhouse Boulder Depot, part of the Boulder Junction at Depot Square development.

References

Culture of Boulder, Colorado
Former Union Pacific Railroad stations in Colorado
Buildings and structures in Boulder, Colorado
Railway stations in the United States opened in 1890
Railway stations closed in 1957
Transportation buildings and structures in Boulder County, Colorado